This is a list of the Philippines' provinces sorted by population, based on the population census of August 1, 2015 conducted by the Philippine Statistics Authority.

Population of provinces in this list includes population of highly urbanized cities, which are administratively independent of the province.

Population counts for the regions do not add up to the national total.

2020 Census

2015 Census

2000 Census
Showing provinces existing at the time of census. Figures do not add up to total as population in disputed areas are added up to the next higher subdivision.

1995 Census
Showing provinces existing at the time of census.

1975 Census
Showing provinces existing at the time of census.

1903 Census
Showing provinces existing at the time of census.

See also
Demographics of the Philippines
Provinces of the Philippines
List of Philippine provinces by Human Development Index

References

Sources
 Census 2000 Final Count

Population
Philippines, population